The Klan: A Legacy of Hate in America is a 1982 American short documentary film directed by Werner Schumann. It was nominated for an Academy Award for Best Documentary Short.

References

External links

1982 films
1980s short documentary films
American short documentary films
American black-and-white films
Documentary films about racism in the United States
Films about the Ku Klux Klan
1980s English-language films
1980s American films